Mike Shehan is co-founder and CEO of SpotX.

Career
In 1996, Mike Shehan founded his first company called LOGEX International, LLC, a provider of e-commerce solutions focused on the retail and catalog industries.

LOGEX was eventually sold to AppNet where Shehan served as President of its two fastest-growing divisions, e-Commerce Solutions and Outsourcing Services.

Shehan launched his second venture, Ereo, a search engine for images in 2000.

In 2001, Shehan co-founded Booyah Networks, Inc., an image-enhanced pay-per-click search engine platform. In 2006, Booyah was 23rd on the list of the 500 fastest-growing companies in the US. In 2007, Shehan realigned the business into a search engine marketing agency and targeted video advertising as his next endeavor.

In 2007, Mike co-founded the video advertising platform SpotXchange, which was renamed SpotX in 2015. Today, SpotX is the leading global video advertising platform shaping digital video and the future of TV.

European broadcast firm RTL Group bought two-thirds of SpotX, for $144 million and then purchased the rest of the company for $145 million in a deal that valued SpotX at $404 million.

In 2021, SpotX was acquired by Magnite, Inc., the world’s largest independent sell-side advertising platform for $1.17 Billion.

Awards
 Ernst & Young Entrepreneur of the Year: Mike Shehan and Steve Swoboda - 2013 (citation)

References

Living people
Year of birth missing (living people)
American company founders